The NCAA Division II women's volleyball tournament is the annual event that decides the championship contested by the NCAA. It determines the national champion of Division II women's collegiate volleyball. It has been held annually since 1981, typically played in December after the fall regular season (the men's championship, conversely, is held in the spring).

The most recent champions are the West Texas A&M Buffaloes, who won their fourth title in 2022, their first since 1997.  In 2022 National Championship, West Texas A&M defeated the most successful team Concordia–Saint Paul, who had won nine titles (winning 2007-13, 16-17) in a timespan of only eleven years.

History
From 1970 through 1980, before the NCAA governed women's collegiate athletics, the Association for Intercollegiate Athletics for Women alone conducted the women's collegiate volleyball championships.

Volleyball was one of twelve women's sports added to the NCAA championship program for the 1981-82 school year, as the NCAA engaged in battle with the AIAW for sole governance of women's collegiate sports. The AIAW continued to conduct its established championship program in the same twelve (and other) sports; however, after a year of dual women's championships, the NCAA conquered the AIAW and usurped its authority and membership.

There is also an NCAA Men's National Collegiate Volleyball Championship for men's volleyball teams in Division I and Division II seeing as there are far fewer men's programs than women's.

Champions
Note: See Association for Intercollegiate Athletics for Women Champions for the Division II volleyball champions from 1975 to 1981.  NOTE:  In 1981 there were both NCAA and AIAW champions.

Records
 Most championships: Concordia–St. Paul (9)
 Undefeated Seasons:  Hawaii Pacific (2000), Concordia–St. Paul (2009), Cal State San Bernardino (2019)

Summary

 Schools highlighted in pink are closed or no longer sponsor athletics.
 Schools highlight in yellow have reclassified to another NCAA division.

See also
NCAA Women's Volleyball Championships (Division I, Division III)
AIAW Intercollegiate Women's Volleyball Champions
NCAA Men's Volleyball Championships (Divisions I and II, Division III)
NAIA Volleyball Championship
AVCA

References

External links
  NCAA Division II Women's Volleyball

Volleyball, Women's
 
NCAA Women's Vol
USA
1981 establishments in the United States
Recurring sporting events established in 1981